Nowa Motława is a branch of the Motława river in the district (dzielnica) Śródmieście of the city of Gdańsk in Poland. It was artificially created in 1576.

Nowa Motława and Motława are forming Granary Island.

History
The Motława river is the oldest part of the trade port. On the eastern bank granaries had been erected since the 14th century. The dug-through of Nowa Motława was made in 1576.The water was regulated by the Stone Lock (Kamienna Śluza).

In 1997, the Marina Gdańsk was created in the northern part of Nowa Motława. It has a length of 290 meters.

Bridges
The Voivodeship road DW 501 is leading over the southern part of the Granary Island and both parts of the river Motława.

In 1864, Most Stągiewny at the Milk Can Gate (Brama Stągiewna) was reconstructed in steel. Between 1925 and 1945, it was used by the tramway.

The Mattenbuden Gate was served by the Most na Szopy. In 1945, the bridge was destroyed.

References

See also 

 Ołowianka and Stepka Channel

Rivers of Poland
Rivers of Pomeranian Voivodeship
2Nowa Motława